Dorothy is a hamlet in southern Alberta, Canada within Special Area No. 2.

The community was named for Dorothy Wilson, a young girl that lived in the area at the time the post office opened.

Dorothy is home to two former churches, a United Church that was in service between 1932 and 1961, and Our Lady of Perpetual Help Roman Catholic Church that was in service between 1944 and 1967. They hosted numerous social events for the area.

Demographics 
Dorothy recorded a population of 14 in the 1991 Census of Population conducted by Statistics Canada.

See also 
List of communities in Alberta
List of hamlets in Alberta

References

External links 

Hamlets in Alberta
Special Area No. 2